The Forum of Fargo-Moorhead or more recently The Forum is an American, English language newspaper.  It is the major newspaper for Fargo, North Dakota and the surrounding region, including Moorhead, Minnesota. It is the flagship and namesake of Forum Communications. The Forum, as it is commonly known, is the primary paper for southeast North Dakota, and also much of northwest Minnesota. Its average daily circulation was about 47,100 on Sundays and 37,500 on Saturdays prior to reducing its print schedule to semi-weekly. The Fargo Forum was first published on November 17, 1891 by Major A. W. Edwards.  However, it traces its lineage to The Republican, which had been founded by Edwards in 1878 and merged into the Forum in 1894.

It has been owned by the family of Norman B. Black since 1917. Publisher Bill Marcil, Jr. is the son of Black's great-granddaughter; he is the fifth generation of the family to run the paper and the company. It took its current form in 1966 when it merged with the Moorhead Daily News, which was acquired by The Forum in 1957.

The Forum is also co-owned with radio station WDAY AM and TV stations WDAY-TV and WDAZ-TV. It used to own KOYY under the call sign WDAY-FM.  In spring 2008, The Forum's news staff merged with WDAY-AM's news team, forming one of the first joint radio-print news-gathering operations in the country.

In 2015, higher education reporter Grace Lyden won the NDNA's Rookie of the Year award for her "bulldog tenacity."

In 2020, the newspaper reduced its print schedule to Wednesdays and Saturdays due to economic stress caused by the pandemic.

See also
 List of newspapers in Minnesota
WDAY-TV
WDAY AM

References

External links
The Forum website
Forum Communications Company website
WDAY TV and WDAY AM website

Newspapers published in North Dakota
Fargo–Moorhead
Forum Communications Company